Erkan Sağlık (born 19 August 1985) is a Swedish-born Turkish former footballer who played as a defender.

References

External links
Erkan Sağlık profile on Varbergs BoIS
Fotbolltransfers profile

1985 births
Swedish people of Turkish descent
Living people
Swedish footballers
Sweden youth international footballers
Turkish footballers
Turkey under-21 international footballers
Association football defenders
Västra Frölunda IF players
IFK Göteborg players
GIF Sundsvall players
Kocaelispor footballers
Nybergsund IL players
Syrianska FC players
Emirates Club players
Al Salmiya SC players
Varbergs BoIS players
Allsvenskan players
Superettan players
TFF First League players
Norwegian First Division players
UAE Pro League players
Swedish expatriate footballers
Turkish expatriate footballers
Expatriate footballers in Norway
Swedish expatriate sportspeople in Norway
Turkish expatriate sportspeople in Norway
Expatriate footballers in the United Arab Emirates
Swedish expatriate sportspeople in the United Arab Emirates
Turkish expatriate sportspeople in the United Arab Emirates
Expatriate footballers in Kuwait
Swedish expatriate sportspeople in Kuwait
Turkish expatriate sportspeople in Kuwait